Mount Cobetas  (Spanish: Monte Cobetas; Basque: Kobeta Mendi)  is a mountain in the city of Bilbao, Spain. It raises between the neighborhoods of Altamira and Zorroza, both located in the district Basurto-Zorroza. On the top stands the ruins of the Altamira Fort, used during the Spanish Civil War.

It is known locally as the location of the open air music festival Bilbao BBK Live, that takes place during the first weekend of July.

Geography of Bilbao
Tourist attractions in Bilbao
Parks in Spain
Mountains of the Basque Country (autonomous community)